Metaleptea is a genus of short-horned grasshoppers in the family Acrididae. There are at least two described species in Metaleptea, found in North, Central, and South America.

Species
These species belong to the genus Metaleptea:
 Metaleptea adspersa (Blanchard, 1843)
 Metaleptea brevicornis (Johannson, 1763) (clip-wing grasshopper)

References

External links

 

Acrididae